Warrant Live 86–97 is the first live compilation album by American glam metal band Warrant released in 1997. It was recorded live at Harpos Concert Theatre, Detroit, Michigan on November 22, 1996 in support of their most recent album Belly to Belly.

Overview
The album features tracks from all of the band's previous albums which include most of Warrant's hit singles, including the band's biggest two singles "Heaven" and "Cherry Pie", all of which charted on the Mainstream Rock charts and The Billboard Hot 100.

The album was re-packaged and re-released in 2005 under the title "Warrant: Live Extended Versions" featuring only ten of the sixteen tracks and again in 2014 as "Warrant 10 Live".

Track listing

 "Intro" (0:28)
 "D.R.F.S.R." (2:16)
 "Down Boys" (3:52)
 "Uncle Tom's Cabin" (5:08)
 "A.Y.M." (3:11)
 "Family Picnic" (6:01)
 "Machine Gun" (4:12)
 "Heaven" (2:38)
 "Sometimes She Cries" (2:19)
 "I Saw Red" (4:39)
 "Hole in My Wall" (3:46)
 "Feels Good" (5:00)
 "Indian Giver" (6:01)
 "32 Pennies" (5:23)
 "Vertigo" (4:01)
 "Cherry Pie" (7:28)

Extended Versions
 "Down Boys"
 "32 Pennies"
 "Cherry Pie"
 "Hole in My Wall"
 "Family Picnic"
 "Feels Good"
 "Heaven"
 "Sometimes She Cries"
 "I Saw Red"
 "Uncle Tom's Cabin"

10 Live!
 "Cherry Pie"
 "Down Boys"
 "Uncle Tom's Cabin"
 "Heaven"
 "Sometimes She Cries"
 "I Saw Red"
 "D.R.F.S.R."
 "32 Pennies" (5:23)
 "Machine Gun"
 "Hole in My Wall"

Credits
 Jani Lane: Lead Vocals
 Erik Turner: Rhythm Guitar
 Jerry Dixon: Bass
 Rick Steier: Lead Guitar
 Bobby Borg: Drums
 Danny Wagner: Keyboards

References

External links
 Warrant Official Site
 Warrant Official MySpace Site
 Classic Warrant Videos on Sony BMG MusicBox

Warrant (American band) albums
1997 live albums
Sanctuary Records live albums